The 2009 Central American and Caribbean Championships (Spanish: XXII Campeonato CAC Atletismo) was the twenty second edition of the tournament and was held between 3 and 7 July in Havana, Cuba.

Event summary
The host country Cuba dominated the tournament, winning the most gold, silver, and bronze medals, and finishing with a total of 53 medals. Jamaica and Trinidad and Tobago were joint second with two gold, five silver and seven bronze medals. Colombia, Puerto Rico and Saint Kitts and Nevis also picked up two gold medals.

Championships records were broken in over a quarter of the athletics events, bringing a total of 11 new records. A handful of national records were also broken at the Championships.

Three athletes won double golds: Virgil Hodge won the 200 metres and 4×100 metres relay titles, Emmanuel Callender won the 100 metres then helped the Trinidad and Tobago relay team to victory, while Yudileyvis Castillo completed a 5000 and 10,000 metres double.

The 2009 edition of the Championships saw a number of nations win their first gold medal in the history of the competition. Shara Proctor took the long jump gold for Anguilla, Tahesia Harrigan won the British Virgin Islands' first gold in the 100 metres, and the Saint Kitts and Nevis relay team won the country's first ever gold medal in women's events.

A number of invitational guest athletes competed at the Championships. Although each country could only have two representatives, it could also enter additional athletes. Their performances, however, were not eligible for medals at the competition. Cuba entered a number of athletes and relay teams in this way. One such competitor, Arnie David Giralt, recorded 17.46 m in the triple jump, which was ultimately better than gold medallist Alexis Copello's best jump.

Records

Key

Key

Medal summary

Men

Women

Medal table

Participating nations

 (3)
 (2)
 (26)
 (12)
 (1)
 (6)
 (9)
 (6)
 (16)
 (14)
 (114)
 (27)
 (3)
 (10)
 (5)
 (4)
 (33)
 (19)
 (5)
 (3)
 (26)
 (9)
 (2)
 (6)
 (28)
 (9)
 (24)

See also
2009 in athletics (track and field)

References
General
Clavelo Robinson, Javier (2009-07-04). “Things on course for Berlin” - Savigne, world leading 14.97m; Robles runs 13.18w - CAC Champs Day 1. IAAF. Retrieved on 2009-07-14.
Clavelo Robinson, Javier (2009-07-05). Suarez tallies World leading 8654 points in Decathlon - CAC Champs Day 2. IAAF. Retrieved on 2009-07-14.
Clavelo Robinson, Javier (2009-07-06). Culson prevails over Sanchez as six more records fall - CAC Champs Final Day . IAAF. Retrieved on 2009-07-14.
XXII Campeonato CAC Atletismo 2009. Central American and Caribbean Athletic Confederation. Retrieved on 2009-07-14.
Specific

External links
Official web site
Official technical handbook

Central American And Caribbean Championships In Athletics, 2009
Central American and Caribbean Championships in Athletics
Athletics
International athletics competitions hosted by Cuba